Katherine Louise Diana Amess (born 19 July 1985) is an English actress and model. She has appeared in many British television commercials and has had several film and television roles.

Early life and education
Amess was born on 19 July 1985 in Basildon, Essex, the second of five children and the eldest of four daughters of Conservative MP David Amess and his wife Julia Arnold.

She attended St Anne Line Primary School in Basildon before going to the Brentwood Ursuline Convent High School in Brentwood, Essex, and finally St Bernard's High School in Westcliff-on-Sea, Essex. She went on to study Drama at Queen Mary University of London and the Royal Central School of Speech and Drama in London.

Career
Amess competed in several British beauty pageants and won the title of Miss Essex 2008 for the Miss Earth 2008 contest. In the same year she also became a finalist for the Miss England competition.

She has appeared in a host of television commercials including for Nintendo, Premier Inn and News of the World. She appeared as Paris Hilton in two national commercials. She has appeared on various television shows in the UK including Funny Cuts on E4 and Dream Team.

In 2013, Amess signed on to play a lead in the musical parody Miserable Lesbians in New York and Edinburgh. The show was adapted from the Oscar-winning Les Misérables and attracted global attention due to the issues of homosexual marriage and sex equality it raised. Amess reprised her role of Courgette (aka Cosette) from an earlier 2013 short-film version in support of homosexual rights of Miserable Lesbians for the "Toscars" at the Grauman's Chinese Theatre in Hollywood which saw the film sweep the boards, winning 8 out of 10 awards presented by Eric Roberts. 

She was cast as Lulu in William Friedkin's version of Harold Pinter's The Birthday Party at The Geffen Playhouse alongside Tim Roth, Steven Berkoff, David O'Hara, Frances Barber and Nick Ullett. She went on to play Ulcie in the closing week of Rolin Jones' These Paper Bullets at the same theatre in 2015.

Amess played Brenda Dixon in Ray Cooney's Cash on Delivery, alongside Cooney himself in December 2015. The performance received positive reviews: "The ensemble [..] under Cooney's keen direction are all great [...] Katie Amess as Norman's innocent, confused fiancee Brenda. There is not a flaw, not a missed cue. No one stands above anyone else. Cooney as director has gleaned a perfect sense of timing from the entire cast". "The equally looks-blessed Meire, Arcilla, and Amess prove themselves all three expert comediennes [...] Amess's delightful but dim Brenda match[es] the male costars every step of the way".

In 2016, she appeared in the film Captain America: Civil War. In 2017, she played Kendall Nagel in Bull on CBS and Sandy Weeks in Criminal Minds Beyond Borders Season 2 also on CBS.

In February 2022, it was reported that she had agreed to continue her late father's work mentoring children considering politics by becoming the patron of the UK's Children's Parliament.

Filmography

Film

Television

References

External links
 
 
 

1985 births
21st-century English actresses
Actresses from Essex
Alumni of Queen Mary University of London
Alumni of the Royal Central School of Speech and Drama
English female models
English television actresses
Living people
People educated at Brentwood Ursuline Convent High School
People from Basildon